is a Japanese former swimmer. She competed in two events at the 1956 Summer Olympics.

References

External links
 

1940 births
Living people
Japanese female freestyle swimmers
Olympic swimmers of Japan
Swimmers at the 1956 Summer Olympics
Place of birth missing (living people)